Dextella khaoyaiana is a moth of the family Erebidae first described by Michael Fibiger in 2011. It is found in central Thailand.

The wingspan is about 11.5 mm. The forewings are short, relatively narrow and beige. The postmedial line is suffused with many brown scales on the distal side. There are blackish-brown patches basally on the costa and also in the upper medial and terminal areas. The crosslines are weakly marked and light brown. The terminal line is indicated by black-brown interveinal dots. The hindwing ground colour is grey with a well-marked discal spot.

References

Micronoctuini
Moths described in 2011
Taxa named by Michael Fibiger